UMIP or umip may refer to:

 Universidad Marítima Internacional de Panamá, the International Maritime University of Panama
 User-mode Instruction Prevention (umip), a CPUID feature bit for the x86 architecture
 UMIP, a Proxy Mobile IPv6 implementation

See also
 UMIPS or MIPS OS, a discontinued UNIX operating system developed by MIPS Computer Systems